TGHS may refer to:
 Terrifying Girls' High School, a Japanese film series
 Tejgaon Government High School, Dhaka, Bangladesh
 Toll Gate High School, Warwick, Rhode Island, United States
Gaming Group:
 TGHS The Gods Have Sent